Escher (named for M. C. Escher, "a master of endless loops") is a declarative programming language that supports both functional programming and logic programming models, developed by J.W. Lloyd in the mid-1990s. It was designed mostly as a research and teaching vehicle. The basic view of programming exhibited by Escher and related languages is that a program is a representation of a theory in some logic framework, and the program's execution (computation) is a deduction from the theory. The logic framework for Escher is Alonzo Church's simple theory of types.

Escher, notably, supports I/O through a monadic type representing the 'outside world', in the style of Haskell.
One of the goals of Escher's designers was to support meta-programming, and so the language has comprehensive support for generating and transforming programs.

Examples
MODULE      Lambda.
CONSTRUCT   Person/0.
FUNCTION    Jane, Mary, John: One -> Person.

FUNCTION    Mother : Person * Person -> Boolean.
Mother(x,y) =>
    x=Jane & y=Mary.

FUNCTION    Wife : Person * Person -> Boolean.
Wife(x,y) =>
    x=John & y=Jane.

FUNCTION    PrimitiveRel : (Person * Person -> Boolean) -> Boolean.
PrimitiveRel(r) =>
    r=Mother \/ r=Wife.

FUNCTION    Rel : (Person * Person -> Boolean) -> Boolean.
Rel(r) =>
    PrimitiveRel(r) \/
    (SOME [r1,r2]
        (r = LAMBDA [u] (SOME [z] (r1(Fst(u),z) & r2(z,Snd(u)))) &
            PrimitiveRel(r1) & PrimitiveRel(r2))).

References
 Declarative programming in Escher, JW Lloyd, University of Bristol, Bristol, UK, 1995
 An implementation of Escher (Some dead links can be reached from the archived page (or by substituting the new domain in the link in question).)

Functional languages